Oscar Phelps Austin (27 July 1847 – 6 January 1933) was an American statistician. The earlier years of his life were spent in journalism, and he served as reporter, editor, and correspondent.

Life and career

Early life 
Austin was born in Newark, Illinois, to Benjamin Austin, a farmer and state legislator of Nebraska and Emeline Phelps. Toward's the end of the Civil War, Oscar served in the Union Army.

Education 
Austin never received an education above the basic education available to males at the time. On June 11, 1913, George Washington University awarded him a Master of Arts.

Career 
Austin moved to Chicago in 1871 to start his journalism career. By 1873, he moved to Cincinnati and continued his journalism career there until 1881. To further his writing career, he moved to Washington D. C., where he became a correspondent for Metropolitan dailies. He helped edit campaign documents for the Republican National Committee.

While living in Washington, D. C., Austin applied for a patent. Patent number US429079, was for the "Process of Resurfacing Phonograph-Blanks". This patent was approved and later cited by another inventor when patenting a similar technique for records.

Austin was appointed chief of the Bureau of Statistics of the Department of Commerce and Labor on May 9, 1897 by President William McKinley. McKinley had noticed, while Austin was a newspaperman, that his news stories always contain figures. When the Bureau of Statistics was merged into the Bureau of Foreign and Domestic Commerce in 1912, Austin became its assistant chief.

From 1903 to 1914, Austin was a professor of commerce and statistics at George Washington University. He then became statistician of the foreign trade department of the National City Bank in New York City.  He wrote about the commerce of nations and continents, comparisons of colonial systems, and national debts.

Marriage and children 
While in Cincinnati, Austin meet and married Anna May Richardson (21 May 1854 - 10 June 1938), daughter of John Richardson and Mercy Maria Ames. Oscar and Anna had one daughter.
 Florence May Austin (10 December 1875 - 8 February 1942). Florence never married.

Published works 
 Uncle Sam's Secrets: A Story of National Affairs for the Youth of the Nation, 1897
 ... Uncle Sam's Soldiers: A Story of the War with Spain, 1898
 Colonial Systems of the World, 1899
 Commercial South and Central America, 1899
 Great Canals of the World, 1899
 Commercial Africa, 1900
 Submarine Telegraphs of the World, 1900
 Colonial Administration, 1901
 Commercial Alaska, 1901
 Commercial China, 1903
 Commercial Japan, 1903
 Historical Map of the United States, 1903
 Commercial India, 1904
 Steps in the Expansion of Our Territory, 1904
 Commercial Prize of the Orient, 1905
 Annual Review of the Foreign Commerce of the United States, 1913
 Economics of World Trade, 1916
 Trading with the Far East, 1920
 Course in Foreign Trade, Volumes 1-12
 Studies on the World's Commerce
 Steps on the Expansion of Our Territory
 Trading with Our Neighbors in the Caribbean
 Uncle Sam's Boy at War: An American Boy Sees the European War
 Uncle Sam's Children: A Story of Life in the Philippines

Elections of Memberships 
 Academy of Political and Social Science
 American Association for the Advancement of Science
 International Colonial Institute
 International Union of  Comparative Jurisprudence and Political Economy
 Washington Economic Society
 Secretary of The National Geographic Society
 Associate Editor of The National Geographic Society

References

Sources
Open Library listing for Austin

1848 births
1933 deaths
George Washington University faculty
American economics writers
American male non-fiction writers
Economists from Illinois
American statisticians